Loop was an unincorporated community in West Mahoning Township, Indiana County, Pennsylvania. The community was named for its location near a loop in the meandering Mahoning Creek. Lysander Barrett settled in the area around 1842; an iron furnace was erected in 1847. Before its eventual abandonment, the community had a post office (from 1885 to 1959), a schoolhouse, and a stop on the Buffalo, Rochester and Pittsburgh Railway.

References

Unincorporated communities in Indiana County, Pennsylvania
Unincorporated communities in Pennsylvania